The 2013–14 Central Coast Mariners FC season was the club's ninth season since its establishment in 2004, and included the 2013–14 A-League season as well as the 2014 AFC Champions League.

After their second placing in the A-League Premiership behind debutantes Western Sydney Wanderers followed by their maiden Championship (also against the Wanderers), the Mariners finished their previous season in the Round of 16 of the AFC Champions League – their best ever result in the continental competition, including their first win away in Asia against K-League side Suwon Bluewings.

Despite the retirement of central defender Patrick Zwaanswijk and the departure of goalkeeper Mathew Ryan, attacking midfielder Oliver Bozanic, striker Bernie Ibini-Isei and right back Pedj Bojić during the pre-season — and continued departures during the season, including Head Coach Graham Arnold and Head of Sports Science Andrew Clark — the Mariners came close to repeating that success, finishing third in the 2013–14 A-League and reaching the semi-final against Western Sydney Wanderers along with narrowly missing out on reaching the Round of 16 of the Champions League.

Season overview

May 2013
Following an injury-plagued stint at K-League side Chunnam Dragons which subsequently saw that club grant him a release early in 2013, Matt Simon re-signed with the Mariners on a one-year contract on 16 May.

Citing increasing physical and mental stress associated with the constant commute between his home and personal training business in Sydney and the Mariners' home base on the Central Coast, Pedj Bojić sought and was subsequently granted a release from the final year of his contract with effect from 24 May. Bojić subsequently signed with Sydney FC on 19 June.

Having been linked with a number of European clubs during the January transfer window, goalkeeper Mathew Ryan signed a 3-year deal with Belgian Pro League club Club Brugge on 30 May, in the process turning down an offer from Danish Superliga side Randers.

June 2013
After trialling with Club Brugge during the January transfer window and with French Ligue 1 side Lille after the Grand Final, Bernie Ibini-Isei signed a 3-year deal with Chinese Super League newcomers Shanghai SIPG on 4 June.

Midfielder Adriano Pellegrino and left back Brad McDonald moved to National Premier Leagues NSW side Central Coast Mariners Academy on 5 June after the conclusion of their contracts.

The club announced on 8 June that striker Daniel McBreen would join Shangahi SIPG on loan until the end of October; he would be available to play for the Mariners again in the Round 4 F3 Derby on 2 November.

On 19 June the club confirmed that Oliver Bozanic would be transferring to Swiss Super League club FC Luzern on a two-year contract.

July 2013
On 5 July the club announced the signing of Argentinian and former Melbourne Victory marquee Marcos Flores on a one-year deal following his release from the Victory.

On 8 July the club announced the signing of former Perth Glory defender Storm Roux to a two-year contract, along with a three-year contract for Tom Slater, midfielder from Sydney FC's National Youth League side and son of former Socceroo Robbie Slater.

On 9 July the club announced the signing of Dutch defender Marcel Seip from Eerste Divisie side VVV-Venlo on a three-year contract.

August 2013
On 23 August the club announced the signing of former Sydney FC, Wellington Phoenix, Brisbane Roar and Newcastle Jets goalkeeper Liam Reddy on a one-year "zero-tolerance" contract. This signing was viewed as highly controversial given his previous drunken behaviour at Sydney FC (which resulted in his contract being terminated in April 2012) and violent conduct against Mariners players Matt Simon and Wayne O'Sullivan.

On 30 August it was announced that Graham Arnold had signed a contract to remain as Head Coach for the Mariners until the end of the 2015–16 season.

November 2013
On 14 November the club announced that Graham Arnold had signed a two-year deal to become the manager of J.League Division 1 side Vegalta Sendai; former assistant manager Phil Moss was promoted to Head Coach with immediate effect. Foundation player and former Wellington Phoenix assistant coach Wayne O'Sullivan was announced as Moss' replacement as assistant coach on 21 November.

On 22 November the club announced that Zachary Anderson and Trent Sainsbury had extended their contracts; Anderson will remain until the end of the 2014–15 season while Sainsbury will continue until the end of the 2015–16 season.

December 2013
On 1 December the club confirmed that Andrew Clark, Head of Sports Science and foundation player, would be joining Graham Arnold at Vegalta Sendai following the Mariners' Round 10 game against Adelaide United in Adelaide.

On 23 December the club confirmed that Michael McGlinchey would move to Vegalta Sendai on loan following the Round 13 game against Melbourne Heart until the end of the 2014 J.League Division 1 season; in addition Bernie Ibini-Isei will return on loan from Shanghai SIPG from the Round 14 game against Wellington Phoenix until 31 May 2014.

January 2014
During a training session on 2 January, Marcos Flores sustained an injury to his right knee, which was subsequently confirmed to be a ruptured anterior cruciate ligament; the club announced on 3 January that Flores had been ruled out for the remainder of the season.

On 31 January the club announced two departures:
 Trent Sainsbury would be transferring to Eredivisie club PEC Zwolle on a -year contract, effective immediately;
 Daniel McBreen would be returning to Shanghai SIPG on a one-year contract, effective immediately.

February 2014
On 1 February the club announced that former Guangzhou R&F defender Eddy Bosnar would be joining the club until the end of May.

On 2 February the club announced that former Ulsan Hyundai winger Kim Seung-Yong had signed with the club for the remainder of the season.

The club announced the following signings on 5 February:
 Glen Trifiro was signed on loan from Sydney United until the end of May;
 Matt Sim was signed on loan from Sutherland Sharks until the end of May;
 Isaka Cernak was signed on a contract until the end of the 2014–15 season after being released by Perth Glory.

March 2014
The club announced on 15 March that goalkeeper Liam Reddy had been granted a two-year contract extension, keeping him at the Mariners until the conclusion of the 2015–16 season.

On 29 March the club announced that it would not be renewing Marcos Flores' contract when it expired at the end of May.

April 2014
On 11 April the club announced that it had signed Glen Trifiro — who had been on loan from Sydney United until the end of May — to a one-year contract.

On 18 April the club announced that it had signed Matt Sim — who had been on loan from Sutherland Sharks until the end of May — to a one-year contract.

Players

Squad information
Players who have been announced as contracted to the Central Coast Mariners senior squad for the 2013–14 season.

Squad statistics

|-
|colspan="14"|Players no longer at the club:

|}

Transfers

Winter

In

Out

Summer

In

Out

Pre-season and friendlies

Competitions

Overall

A-League

League table

Results summary

Results by round

Matches

Finals Series

League goalscorers per round

Own goals

AFC Champions League

Group stage

Goalscorers

2 goals
  Mile Sterjovski
1 goal
  Nick Fitzgerald
  Marcel Seip

Own goal
  John Hutchinson

National Youth League

League table

Results summary

Results by round

Matches

League Goalscorers per Round

Awards
 NAB Young Footballer of the Month (October) – Trent Sainsbury
 Player of the Week (Round 5) – Liam Reddy
 NAB Young Footballer of the Month (December) – Storm Roux

References

External links
 Official Central Coast Mariners Website
 Official A-League website

Central Coast Mariners FC seasons
Central Coast